Iris Tió Casas (born 2 November 2002 in Barcelona) is a Spanish synchronised swimmer.

She won a bronze medal in the free routine combination competition at the 2018 European Aquatics Championships.

Notes

References

External links
 
 
 
 

2002 births
Living people
Spanish synchronized swimmers
European Aquatics Championships medalists in synchronised swimming
Olympic synchronized swimmers of Spain
Synchronized swimmers at the 2020 Summer Olympics
Artistic swimmers at the 2022 World Aquatics Championships
World Aquatics Championships medalists in synchronised swimming
Swimmers from Barcelona